Jeanne Ferrante is a computer scientist active in the field of compiler technology, where she has made important contributions regarding optimization and parallelization. Jeanne Ferrante is  Professor of Computer Science and Engineering at University of California, San Diego. She received her B.A. from New College at Hofstra University in 1969, and her Ph.D. from Massachusetts Institute of Technology in 1974. Prior to joining UC San Diego in 1994, she taught at Tufts University from 1974 until 1978, where she worked on computational complexity problems such as the theory of rational order and first order theory of real addition. In 1978, she worked as a research staff at the IBM T.J. Watson Research Center until 1994.

Dr. Ferrante's work has included the development of intermediate representations for optimizing and parallelizing compilers, most notably the Program Dependence Graph and Static Single Assignment (SSA) form. She is a Fellow of the Association for Computing Machinery (ACM) and a Fellow of the Institute of Electrical and Electronics Engineers (IEEE). Her SSA work (with colleagues from IBM) was recognized in 2006 by the ACM Programming Language Achievement Award as a "significant and lasting contribution to the field."
As Associate Dean, she co-founded UCSD Teams In Engineering Service (now Global TIES), which partners multidisciplinary teams of undergraduates with non-profit organizations to provide long-term technical solutions. Dr. Ferrante also co-founded the UCSD Women's Leadership Alliance, whose aim is to advance leadership development, networking, and recognition of women campus leaders at UC San Diego. She was honored as a UCSD Community Champion for Diversity in 2004 and 2012, and received the 2007 Athena Educator Pinnacle Award for her diversity leadership efforts.

She is currently a professor at the University of California, San Diego,  where she has also held the positions  of Associate Vice Chancellor for Faculty Equity, and  Associate Dean of the Jacobs School of Engineering. She is a Fellow of the Association for Computing Machinery (1996) and the IEEE (2005).

Education
In 1969, Jeanne Ferrante received her B.A. from New College at Hofstra University in Natural Sciences, with High Honors in Mathematics. She went on to complete a Ph.D. at MIT and wrote her thesis "Some Upper and Lower Bounds on Decision Procedures in Logic".

Recognition
 Thomas  A. Kanneman  Outstanding Service Award, SD County Engineering Council, 2009
 Athena San Diego Pinnacle Educator of the Year Award, 2007
 ACM SIGPLAN Programming Languages Achievement Award for the development of Static Single Assignment (SSA) form (with Ron Cytron, Barry Rosen, Mark Wegman and Ken Zadeck). SSA is a program  representation that   yields  faster,  more  compact  and  powerful  program optimizations, and the award recognizes SSA as a "significant and lasting contribution to the field of programming  languages".  My contributions led to algorithms that efficiently compute SSA, enabling its implementation in many commercial and research compilers, including GCC (GNU Compiler Collection).  2006
 IEEE Fellow, for contributions to optimizing and parallelizing compilers.  2005
 Highly Cited Researcher, a designation  given to "less than  one-half percent of all publishing researchers," ISIHighlyCited.com.  2005
 UCSD Community Champion for Diversity Award, Academic Affairs. 2004, 2012
 ACM Fellow, for the development of intermediate program representations for program optimization  and parallelization  that  are fundamental  to current optimizing compilers.  1996
 IBM Outstanding Innovation Award, for co-inventing Static Single Assignment form. 1992
 IBM Outstanding Innovation Award, for co-inventing  the  Program  Dependence  Graph,   a program representation of essential control and data  flow to expose maximal parallelism.  1988
 Edward A. Dickson Emeriti Professorship, May 2021, recognizing teaching, research and community service.

Other interests
She enjoys biking, hiking, playing piano, and painting.

References

External links
 Home page at UCSD

1949 births
Place of birth missing (living people)
Living people
American computer scientists
American women computer scientists
University of California, San Diego faculty
Fellows of the Association for Computing Machinery
Fellow Members of the IEEE
IBM Research computer scientists
21st-century American women